John George Brill (German: Johann Georg Brill) (Kassel, Germany, May 31, 1817 – September 22, 1888) was a co-founder of J. G. Brill and Company, which, at its height, was the largest manufacturer of streetcars and interurban cars in the United States.

In 1847, at the age of 30, he emigrated with his wife and two children from Germany to Philadelphia. For twenty years, he worked for Murphy and Allison.  In 1868, with his son George Martin Brill, he founded the firm J. G. Brill & Son, which, in 1887, became J. G. Brill and Company.

Death and interment
Brill died from heart failure at the age of 71 in Philadelphia County, Pennsylvania on September 22, 1888, and was buried on September 25 at the West Laurel Hill Cemetery in Bala Cynwyd, Montgomery County, Pennsylvania.

References

External links
J. G. Brill and the Brill Brothers – article in the Powelton History Blog

1817 births
1888 deaths
Engineers from Kassel
People from the Electorate of Hesse
Businesspeople from Philadelphia
German railway mechanical engineers
American railroad mechanical engineers
American railway entrepreneurs
Engineers from Pennsylvania
19th-century American businesspeople
Burials at West Laurel Hill Cemetery